Sean Andrew Whaler (born 22 July 2000) is an English professional footballer who plays for Northampton Town, as a midfielder.

Club career
Born in Northampton, Whaler joined Northampton Town at under-9 level and signed his first professional contract in May 2018. After featuring as an unused substitute on several occasions, Whaler made his long-awaited first-team debut during their EFL Trophy defeat to Wycombe Wanderers, replacing Shaun McWilliams in the 1–0 loss.

On 23 November 2018, Whaler was loaned out to AFC Mansfield until the 1st January 2019. The deal was then extended for another month. 

On 5 February 2019, Whaler was loaned out to Banbury United after his loan at AFC Mansfield expired. He made his debut in an Oxfordshire Senior Cup quarter final against Easington Sports and scored his first goal in the sixth minute; helping Banbury to a 3-0 win. Whaler's loan ended earlier than expected as he fractured his fibula during a game.

Career statistics

References

External links

2000 births
Living people
English footballers
Footballers from Northampton
Association football midfielders
Northampton Town F.C. players